The 1933 Iowa Hawkeyes football team represented the University of Iowa in the 1933 Big Ten Conference football season.

Schedule

References

Iowa
Iowa Hawkeyes football seasons
Iowa Hawkeyes football